(born May 25, 1972) is a Japanese actress. She starred along with Megumi Odaka and Natsuki Ozawa in the TV-series Hana no Asuka-gumi!. She also released several singles and six albums and she had one minor hit with the song "Emerald no Suna". Ishida also made numerous commercials for hair products and released several photobooks and videos. Ishida has had at least one song appear on the NHK program Minna no Uta. She is the younger sister of Yuriko Ishida, who is also an actress.

Filmography

Film
 Futari (1991)
 Kamitsukitai / Dorakiyura Yori Ai-0 (1991)
 Aitsu (1991)
 AD Boogie (1991)
 Haruka, Nosutarujii (1993)
 Beru Epokku (1998)
 Fascination Amour (1999)
 Adrenaline Drive (1999)
 Ano Natsu no Hi (1999)
 Kankoku no Obaachan wa Erai (2002)
 Tenkôsei: Sayonara Anata (2007)
 Rin (2018)
 Skeleton Flowers (2021)
 Homestay (2022)
 Grown-ups (2022)

Television
 Hana no Asuka-gumi! (1988)
 Mama Haha Bugi (1989) (mini)
 1970 Bokutachi no Seishun (1991)
 Hirari (1992) (Asadora)
 Asunaro Hakusho (1993)
 Kagayaku Toki no Nakade (1995)
 Tokugawa Yoshinobu (1998)
 Smap x Smap (1998)
 Kôrei (2000)
 Suiyobi no Joji (2001)
 Karuta kuîn (2003)
 Haken no Hinkaku (2007) (mini)
 Toppu Sêrusu (2008)
 Dan Dan だんだん (2009) (Asadora)
 Only I Am 17 Years Old (2020) (Webdrama)
 The Way of the Househusband (2020)

Discography 

 Emerald no Suna / Shiokaze no Himitsu (May 21, 1987) (single)
 Ku.chi.bi.ru / Kiniro no Necklace (04.08.1987) (single)
 Legend (September 21, 1987) (album)
 Koi wa Kakuritsu 51% / Lonely Lonely (04.11.1987) (single)
 Monument (09.03.1988) (album)
 Futari no Kankei / Pastel Memory (April 21, 1988) (single)
 White Virgin (June 21, 1988) (album)
 Shojo.Neppun.Tennenshoku / Ichimai no Shashin (July 13, 1988) (single)
 Koibitotachi no Nuance / Yume o Samenaide (11.10.1988) (single)
 True (October 21, 1988) (album)
 Koi nanonine / Unubore Kagami (February 21, 1989) (single)
 Lamination (April 21, 1989) (album)
 Natural Choice / Nocturne Saigo no Himitsu (July 7, 1989) (single)
 Kaze no Ballerina / Mou Hitori no Akuma (October 18, 1989) (single)
 Rendezvous (November 21, 1989) (album)
 Tomorrow (March 21, 1990) (single)

References

External links 
 Official site 
 Encyclopedia Idollica, a 1980s J-pop idol resource
 
 

Japanese film actresses
Japanese television actresses
1972 births
Living people
Actresses from Tokyo
Singers from Tokyo
Asadora lead actors
20th-century Japanese actresses
20th-century Japanese women singers
20th-century Japanese singers
21st-century Japanese actresses
21st-century Japanese women singers
21st-century Japanese singers
Horikoshi High School alumni